Maleikoniai (Malaikoniai, Maleikonys, formerly) is a village in Kėdainiai district municipality, in Kaunas County, in central Lithuania. According to the 2011 census, the village had a population of 55 people.

There is a new manor style conference hall and rural tourism house.

Demography

References

Villages in Kaunas County
Kėdainiai District Municipality